Kurt Conrad (19 October 1911 – 16 July 1982) was a German politician of the Social Democratic Party (SPD) and former member of the German Bundestag.

Life 
Conrad was a member of the state parliament of Saarland from 1947 to 1952, 1955 to 1957 and 1960 to 1975. From 1961 to 1970 and 1971 to 1973 he was chairman of the SPD parliamentary group there. From 1957 until his resignation on 20 July 1959, Conrad was a member of the German Bundestag, where he represented the constituency of Homburg. From 29 October 1957 to 25 February 1959 he was also a member of the European Parliament.

Literature

References

1911 births
1982 deaths
Members of the Bundestag for Saarland
Members of the Bundestag 1957–1961
Members of the Bundestag for the Social Democratic Party of Germany
Members of the Landtag of Saarland
Social Democratic Party of Germany MEPs
MEPs for Germany 1958–1979